Kohrela (also Romanized as Kohrelā) is a village in Dehdez Rural District, Dehdez District, Izeh County, Khuzestan Province, Iran. At the 2006 census, its population was 592, in 134 families. This village is located near a Karoon river. Its people are famous for being brave and generous.

References 

Populated places in Izeh County